Leuchars (Old) railway station served the town of Leuchars, Fife, Scotland from 1848 to 1921 on the Edinburgh and Northern Railway.

History 
The station opened on 17 May 1848 as Leuchars by the Edinburgh and Northern Railway. To the south was a small goods yard and to the north was the signal box, next to the level crossing. The name of the station was changed to Leuchars Junction on 1 July 1852. It closed on 1 June 1878 when the new station opened but it reopened on 1 December 1878 as Leuchars (Old). It closed permanently on 3 October 1921.

References 

Disused railway stations in Fife
Railway stations in Great Britain opened in 1848
Railway stations in Great Britain closed in 1921
Former North British Railway stations
1848 establishments in Scotland
1921 disestablishments in Scotland